Todd Rogers (born 1977) is an American behavioral scientist and Professor of Public Policy at the Harvard Kennedy School.  He is the co-founder of the Analyst Institute and EveryDay Labs (formerly InClass Today).  At Harvard University, he is faculty director of the Behavioral Insights Group  and the director of the Student Social Support R&D Lab. He is also an Academic Advisor at the UK's Behavioral Insights Team and a Senior Researcher at ideas42.

Early life and education
Rogers attended Williams College in Williamstown, Massachusetts, and graduated with a double major in Religion and Psychology. He went on to Harvard University where he received an M.A. in Social Psychology in 2005. In 2008, he received a Ph.D. in Organizational Behavior from Harvard University.

Education research
Rogers's research applies behavioral science insights and methods to understand important social challenges and to develop interventions to mitigate them. His current work examines how to help families effectively support student success (e.g. increasing attendance, homework completion, etc.)

Career
Rogers is the Director of the Student Social Support R&D Lab (S3 R&D Lab) at the Harvard Kennedy School. The Lab uses data and behavioral science to develop and prove scalable, high ROI interventions that mobilize and empower students’ social support systems to improve achievement.

Rogers is the co-founder and chief scientist at EveryDay Labs, an organization which seeks to improve student outcomes through behavioral science interventions. The Lab works in partnerships with school districts to reduce absences at-scale. The Lab's trademark absence intervention project, Present!, is proven to reduce the rate of chronic absenteeism by 10-15% in a K-12 setting.

Rogers was the founding executive director of the Analyst Institute and remains a member of the Institute's Board of Directors. The Analyst Institute uses randomized field experiments and behavior science insights to understand and improve voter communication programs. The organization collaborates with progressive organizations and campaigns around the country to measure and increase the impact of their programs.

The organization's work in the political realm was covered in The New York Times Magazine, and was also discussed in-depth in Sasha Issenberg's book, The Victory Lab: The Secret Science of Winning Campaigns.

Personal life
Todd enjoys the Spanish-American cultural fusion brought to life through '80s hits, best characterized by the pool singers in the Apple TV hit, "Acapulco".

Selected publications

Politics

 Fernbach, P.M., Rogers, T., Fox, C.R., & Sloman, S.A. (2013). Political Extremism is Supported by an Illusion of Understanding. Psychological Science, 24(6), 939–946.
 Gerber, A.S., & Rogers, T. (2009). Descriptive Social Norms and Motivation to Vote: Everybody's Voting and So Should You. The Journal of Politics, 71(1), 178–191.
 Nickerson, D.W.,& Rogers, T. (2010) Do You Have a Voting Plan?: Implementation Intentions, Voter Turnout, and Organic Plan Making. Psychological Science, 21(2), 194–199.

Education

 Bergman, P., Lasky-Fink, J., & Rogers, T. (2019). Simplification and defaults affect adoption and impact of technology, but decision makers do not realize it. Organizational Behavior and Human Decision Processes.
 Rogers, T. & Feller, A. (2018). Reducing Student Absences at Scale by Targeting Parents' Misbeliefs, Nature Human Behaviour, 2, 335–342.
 Rogers, T. & Feller, A. (2016) Discouraged by Peer Excellence: Exposure to Exemplary Peer Performance Causes Quitting. Psychological Science, 27(3), 365–374.

References 

Living people
1977 births
Harvard Kennedy School faculty
Williams College alumni
Harvard Graduate School of Arts and Sciences alumni